LIONsolver is an integrated software for data mining, business intelligence, analytics, and modeling and reactive business intelligence approach. A non-profit version is also available as LIONoso.

LIONsolver is used to build models, visualize them, and improve business and engineering processes. 

It is a tool for decision making based on data and quantitative model and it can be connected to most databases and external programs. 

The software is fully integrated with the Grapheur business intelligence  and intended for more advanced users.

Overview

LIONsolver originates from research principles in Reactive Search Optimization advocating the use of self-tuning schemes acting while a software
system is running. Learning and Intelligent OptimizatioN refers to the integration of online machine learning schemes into the optimization software, so that
it becomes capable of learning from its previous runs and from human feedback. 
A related approach is that of Programming by Optimization,
which provides a direct way of defining design spaces involving Reactive Search Optimization, and
of Autonomous Search
 advocating adapting problem-solving algorithms.

Version 2.0 of the software was released on Oct 1, 2011, covering also the Unix and Mac OS X operating
systems in addition to Windows.

The modeling components include neural networks, polynomials, locally weighted Bayesian regression, k-means clustering, and self-organizing maps. A free academic license for non-commercial use and class use is available.

The software architecture of LIONsolver 
permits interactive multi-objective optimization, with a user interface for visualizing the results and facilitating
the solution analysis and decision making process.
The architecture allows for problem-specific extensions, and it is
applicable as a post-processing tool for all optimization schemes with a number of
different potential solutions. When the architecture is tightly coupled to a specific
problem-solving or optimization method, effective interactive schemes where the
final decision maker is in the loop can be developed.

On Apr 24, 2013 LIONsolver received the first prize of the Michael J. Fox Foundation –
Kaggle Parkinson's Data Challenge, a contest leveraging "the wisdom of the crowd" to benefit people with Parkinson's disease.

See also 
 Multi-objective optimization

References

External links 
 LIONsolver official non-profit site

Time series software
Data analysis software
Data visualization software
Mathematical optimization software
Numerical software